Peter Schenk may refer to:

 Peter Schenk the Elder (baptized 1660, died 1711–1713), German engraver and cartographer
 Peter Schenk the Younger (1693–1775), Dutch engraver and map publisher